Ajmal Mian (Urdu) (4 July 1934 – 16 October 2017) was a Pakistani jurist who served as the Chief Justice of the Supreme Court of Pakistan from 23 December 1997 to 30 June 1999.

Early life and education

Mian was born on 4 July 1934 in Delhi, India to Muhammad Mian. He received a bachelor's degree in Economics and Political Science from the University of Karachi in 1953. He was called to Degree of an Utter Barrister as a Member of the Honourable Society of Lincoln's Inn London on 5 February 1957; signed the Roll of Barristers of the High Court of Justice, Queen's Bench Division, England on 6 February 1957.
Admitted and enrolled as an Advocate of the High Court of West Pakistan, Karachi Bench on 22 April 1957; admitted and enrolled as an Advocate in the Supreme Court of Pakistan on 7 September 1962; nominated as a member of the Statutory Rule Committee constituted for the erstwhile High Court of Sindh and Balochistan, Karachi under section 123, C.P.C. by the Chief Justice of the High Court in August 1972; practised as an Advocate at Karachi since April 1957 till elevation as a Judge; worked as a counsel to the Karachi Port Trust Board since 1959 till elevation; worked as a counsel to the Auqaf Department and the Evacuee Trust Board for about 15 years; joined Sindh Muslim Law College Karachi as a part-time lecturer in 1958 and held that office till elevation as a Judge; officiated as the Principal of the Sindh Muslim Law College in January and February 1973.

Judicial career
Appointed an Additional Judge of the High Court of Sindh on 18 March 1978; appointed a Judge of the Sindh High Court on 17 March 1980; nominated by the Chief Justice of Sindh High Court on the syndicate N.E.D. Engineering University, Karachi in 1978; nominated by the Acting Chief Justice of the High Court on the Board of Governors for the Government Law Colleges in Karachi in 1980; acted as the Acting Chief Justice of the Balochistan High Court for the period from 1985 to 1987; acted as the Senior Puisne Judge of the Sindh High Court from 1987 till the elevation as the Chief Justice of Sindh High Court on 4 September 1988; attended course on the Court Management at the National Judicial College, Reno Nevada, United States in 1986.

Elevated as a Permanent Judge of the Supreme Court of Pakistan on 10 December 1989, Member of the Committee on Arms Control and Disarmament Law of the International Law Association; participated in Symposium under the Auspices of International Law Association held at Geneva on 9 & 10 June 1995, on the subject or "ONGOING PROLIFERATION CHALLENGES: Legal Aspects”; attended Seminar on “The Rights and Duties of States” that have signed or ratified the Chemical Weapons Convention, on 2 July 1997, at The Hague, Netherlands; contributed an Article published in Volume III of Arms Control and Disarmament Law titled "Future Legal Restraints on Arms Proliferation" published by the United Nations and launched at United Nations Headquarters in November 1996; Member of the Executive Council of Allama Iqbal Open University from September 1996 to December 1997; Chairman, Pakistan Zakat Council from August 1991 to July 1994.
Appointed Acting Chief Justice, Supreme Court of Pakistan, for the period from 28 February 1997 to 4 March 1997, then from 30 May 1997 to 19 June 1997, and again from 10 October 1997 to 13 October 1997 and finally from 3 December 1997 to 23 December 1997; Justice Mian, who took administrative control of the apex court as Acting Chief Justice of Pakistan after a judicial order passed by a 10-member bench. The 10-member bench directed Justice Ajmal Mian to discharge administrative as well as judicial functions of chief justice of the Supreme Court, including the constitution of benches as the appointment of Acting Chief Justice would take some time. Role of Mr Ajmal Mian was controversial here, as he effectively allowed a coup to occur within the supreme court of Pakistan against a sitting chief justice.
    
The court also directed the office not to take any further orders for constituting benches from the chief justice (under restraint) and orders regarding day-to-day working and administration of the court should be obtained from Justice Ajmal Mian till the appointment of Acting Chief Justice.
    
After this order by the 10-member bench headed by Justice Saeeduzzaman Siddiqui, Justice Ajmal Mian took administrative control of the Supreme Court and fixed a new roster and issued a new cause-list. Justice Ajmal Mian constituted six benches including the 10- member bench headed by Saeeduzzaman Siddiqui which would continue hearing the petitions challenging the appointment of Justice Sajjad Ali Shah as Chief Justice of Pakistan.
    
The 10-member bench also took up the petition challenging the Thirteenth Amendment. After the conclusion of two cases, He was appointed permanent Chief Justice of Pakistan on 23 December 1997; Retired as the Chief Justice of Pakistan on 30 June 1999.

Other services

Chairman, Supreme Judicial Council;
Chairman, Pakistan Law Commission;
Chairman, Board of Governors, Federal Judicial Academy;
Member, Board of Trustees of the International Islamic University.
Attended SAARC Chief Justice Conference at Colombo, Sri Lanka.
Attended 6th Congress of the International Association of Supreme Administrative Jurisdiction held at Lisbon, Portugal.
led a Judicial delegation to China for a week in December 1998 at the invitation of the President of the Supreme Peoples' Court China.
Attended II IBEROAMERICAN Summit of Courts presidents & Supreme Tribunals at Caracas, Venezuela between 24 & 26 March 1999.

Book
A Judge Speaks Out, by Ajmal Mian

See also
List of Pakistanis
Chief Justice of Pakistan

References

 Judging the State: Courts and Constitutional Politics in Pakistan, by Paula R. Newburg 

|-

1934 births
2017 deaths
Chief justices of Pakistan
Members of Lincoln's Inn
Muhajir people
Chief Justices of the Sindh High Court
University of Karachi alumni
Chief Justices of the Balochistan High Court
St. Patrick's High School, Karachi alumni